Waterman's Beach Lobster was a family-owned lobster pound in South Thomaston, Maine.  Anne Cousens (maiden name Waterman) opened it in 1986. Her daughter, Sandy Manahan, and daughter-in-law, Lorrie Cousens, closed the place on September 4, 2016.  She didn't want to sell it "because we don't want our name to go downhill."

Besides lobsters and steamed clams, Anne was just as famous for the homemade pies she would bake.
 
In 2017, the Manahan family applied, and was approved, to turn the spot into a microbrewery and tasting room. Sandy's oldest son Heath operates “Waterman’s Beach Brewery” out of the same building

Honors and awards
In 2001, Waterman's won an America's Classics award from the James Beard Foundation.

Epicurious named it one of their 7 Favorite Maine Lobster Shack, pointing out the seaside location (overlooking Penobscot Bay) and picnic tables.

See also
 List of seafood restaurants

References

James Beard Foundation Award winners
Defunct restaurants in the United States
Seafood restaurants in Maine
1986 establishments in Maine
2016 disestablishments in Maine
Restaurants established in 1986
Restaurants disestablished in 2016
Buildings and structures in Knox County, Maine
Defunct seafood restaurants in the United States